CSS Webb, a 655-ton side-wheel steam ram, was originally built in New York City in 1856 as the civilian steamship William H. Webb. She received a Confederate privateer's commission at New Orleans in May 1861, but was instead employed as a transport until January 1862. Converted to a "cotton clad" ram by the Confederate Army, thereafter served on the Mississippi and Red Rivers. On February 24, 1863, under the command of Captain Charles Pierce, she participated in the sinking of the Federal ironclad . Webb was transferred to the Confederate Navy in early 1865.

On April 23–24, 1865, under the command of Charles S. Read, Webb broke through the Federal blockade at the mouth of the Red River, Louisiana, and made a dramatic run down the Mississippi toward the Gulf of Mexico. After eluding several United States Navy vessels and passing New Orleans, she was confronted by the powerful steam sloop . Rather than face the veteran ship's broadside, the Webb was run ashore and destroyed by her crew.

See also
 Blockade runners of the American Civil War
 List of ships of the Confederate States Navy
 Confederate River Defense Fleet
 Mississippi River campaigns
 Red River Campaign

References

Sources
 

-

Cottonclad rams of the Confederate States Navy
1856 ships
Ships built by William H. Webb
Shipwrecks of the American Civil War
Shipwrecks of the Mississippi River
Maritime incidents in April 1865